Protein CBFA2T3 (core-binding factor, runt domain, alpha subunit 2; translocated to, 3) is a protein that in humans is encoded by the CBFA2T3 gene.

Function 

The t(16;21)(q24;q22) translocation is a rare but recurrent chromosomal abnormality associated with therapy-related myeloid malignancies. The translocation produces a chimeric gene made up of the 5'-region of the AML1 gene fused to the 3'-region of this gene. In addition, this gene is a putative breast tumor suppressor. Two transcript variants encoding different isoforms have been found for this gene, and a brefeldin A-sensitive association of RII-alpha protein with one of the isoforms has been demonstrated in the Golgi apparatus.

Interactions 
CBFA2T3 has been shown to interact with:

 HDAC1, 
 HDAC3, 
 LDB1, 
 PRKAR2A,
 RUNX1T1 and 
 TAL1,  and
 TCF3.

References

Further reading

External links 
 
 

Transcription factors
Oncogenes